David Hall is an Australian former professional rugby league footballer who played in the 1990s for the North Sydney Bears and the South Sydney Rabbitohs.

Playing career
Hall made his debut for North Sydney in Round 8 of the 1990 season against the Gold Coast.  Hall's arrival at the club coincided with the club going from easy beats to title contenders in the 1990s.  Hall then went on to play for Norths over the following 8 seasons including 4 preliminary final heartbreaks as the club fell short of an elusive grand final appearance.   At representative level, Hall was selected to replace the sacked John Hopoate on the wing for New South Wales in game III of the 1995 State of Origin series.  Hall joined Souths for the 1998 NRL season and played 5 games for the club before retiring.

References

Sources
 

Australian rugby league players
New South Wales Rugby League State of Origin players
North Sydney Bears players
South Sydney Rabbitohs players
Living people
Rugby league wingers
1968 births